Art Basel is a for-profit, privately owned and managed, international art fair staged annually in Basel, Switzerland; Miami Beach; Hong Kong and from 2022, Paris. Art Basel works in collaboration with the host city's local institutions to help grow and develop art programs. While Art Basel provides a platform for galleries to show and sell their work to buyers, it has gained a large international audience of art spectators and students as well.

History

Basel, Switzerland
Art Basel was started in 1970 by Basel gallerists Ernst Beyeler, Trudl Bruckner and Balz Hilt. In its inaugural year, the Basel show attracted more than 16,000 visitors who viewed work presented by 90 galleries from ten countries. Thirty art publishers also participated. By 1975, five years after its founding, the Basel show reached almost 300 exhibitors. The participating galleries came from 21 countries, attracting 37,000 visitors.

Under the direction of Samuel Keller between 1999 and 2006, Art Basel created Art Unlimited, a section for monumental artworks in the field of sculpture, installations, video art and performances in the newly built Hall 1. The first curators in charge of this very large section were  Simon Lamunière (2000-2011), Gianni Jetzer (2012-2019) followed by Giovanni Carmine (since 2021).

Under the stewardship of Marc Spiegler, the 2019 show in Basel attracted 93,000 visitors over six days. It presented 290 galleries from 35 countries, exhibiting the work of over 4,000 artists. A total of 19 galleries showed in Basel for the first time. Alongside private collectors from Europe, America, and Asia, representatives and groups from over 400 museums and institutions were in attendance.

In 2020, the 50th edition of the fair in Basel was at first postponed to September, but later canceled after many dealers cited concerns about travel and safety in the midst of the COVID-19 pandemic.

In July 2021, Art Basel announced its in person return for 24–26 September. There were 273 exhibitors, among them over 20 participated for the first time.

Miami Beach, Florida
Art Basel Miami Beach was first introduced in 2002 under the direction of Sam Keller.

Spearheaded by Noah Horowitz, Art Basel's Director Americas, the 2019 show in Miami Beach, Florida, presented 269 galleries from 29 countries. Over five days, the show attracted 81,000 visitors, and 20 galleries showed in Miami Beach for the first time.

The 2020 edition, due to take place in December, was cancelled because of the coronavirus pandemic.
Art Basel Miami Beach returned December 2–5, 2021, and was held December 1-3, 2022.

Hong Kong

In 2008, MCH Group, Angus Montgomery Arts and the events organiser Tim Etchells launched Art HK, sparking investor interest in Hong Kong. MCH bought it out in 2013 to create Art Basel Hong Kong, held at Hong Kong Convention and Exhibition Centre. In 2015, Art Basel Hong Kong moved it's office to Shui On Centre, with their new office designed by OPENUU.

The 2019 Hong Kong Exhibition, directed by Adeline Ooi, attracted a record attendance of 88,000 visitors, among them directors, curators, trustees, and patrons from over 130 leading international museums and institutions. On display were 242 galleries from 35 countries and territories. The 2020 edition of the fair was cancelled due to the spread of coronavirus.

The 2021 Hong Kong exhibition ran from 19 to 23 May at the Hong Kong Convention and Exhibition Centre  with 104 galleries from around the world.

Initiatives
Art Basel's initiatives concentrate on the broader art world. Art Basel has three main initiatives: Art Basel Cities, BMW Art Journey, Crowdfunding and The Art Market.

Art Basel Cities is a project between Art Basel and cities worldwide to create cultural events and programming throughout the year. Art Basel, the city's local art stakeholders and the city's officials will sit together and develop a program in line with the city's mid- and long-term cultural development goals. This initiative was launched during the 2016 Hong Kong edition of Art Basel. Cities interested in the collaboration have to apply via an online questionnaire. The first partner city is Buenos Aires.

BMW Art Journey Award is a grant that supports emerging creatives and enables them to go on an artistic journey of their own definition. In 2015, it was established by BMW and Art Basel to reward promising artists from the Discoveries sector in Hong Kong and the Positions sector in Miami Beach. The chosen artist can select the destination and go almost anywhere in the world to explore new ideas, discover new themes, and create new works. A winner is selected twice a year from a shortlist of three finalists during the Art Basel shows in Hong Kong and Miami Beach.

The Crowdfunding Initiative is a partnership between Kickstarter and Art Basel to provide visibility and generate support for projects from non-profit organizations around the world. The projects include artist residencies, education programs, public installations and other innovative artistic projects. They are selected by an independent jury made up of three non-profit art world specialists.

The Art Market is an annual global art market analysis. It covers all aspects of the international market and highlights the most important developments in the previous year. The first report was published in 2017.

Also, the executive-education program Collecting Contemporary Art in Hong Kong was launched by Art Basel, HKU SPACE Centre for Degree Programmes (CDP) and Central Saint Martins College of Arts and Design (CSM).

Pricing structure
A committee of four dealers reviewed art dealers' plans and select the winners in a four-day session several months ahead of each fair. As of 2019, the smallest galleries pay CHF 760 per square metre for a booth at Art Basel, and the largest galleries will pay CHF 905 per square metre. Prices rise relative to each additional square metre.

Leadership
 1991–1999: Lorenzo Rudolf
 2000–2007: Sam Keller
 2007–2008: Cay Sophie Rabinowitz, Annette Schönholzer, Marc Spiegler
 2008–2012: Annette Schönholzer, Marc Spiegler
 2012-2022: Marc Spiegler
 since 2022: Noah Horowitz

Sponsor
UBS is the lead partner of the Art Basel in Basel since 1994, the lead partner of the Art Basel in Miami Beach since its inception in 2002 and the lead partner of the Art Basel in Hong Kong since its inception in 2013.

Further reading
Franz Schultheis, Erwin Single, Stephan Egger, Thomas Mazzurana: When Art meets Money. Encounters at the Art Basel. Verlag Walther König, Cologne 2015. .
Art Basel | Year 45. JRP|Ringier, 2015. .

References

External links

Peeling the $120,000 Art Basel Banana

Art fairs
Tourist attractions in Basel
Culture in Basel
Tourist attractions in Hong Kong
Tourist attractions in Miami